Alexandra Dulgheru was the defending champion, but chose not to participate.

Pauline Parmentier won the title, defeating Océane Dodin in an all-French final, 6–1, 6–1.

Seeds

Main draw

Finals

Top half

Bottom half

References 
 Main draw

Lorraine Open 88 - Singles